The Right Man is a 1925 American silent drama film.

The Right Man may also refer to:

 The Right Man, a novel by June Boland
 The Right Man, a novel by Marie Ferrarella
 The Right Man, a novel by Nigel Planer
 "The Right Man", a song by Christina Aguilera from Back to Basics
 "The Right Man", a song by The Units
 The Right Man: The Surprise Presidency of George W. Bush, a book by David Frum
 The Right Man a 1960 TV movie starring John Alexander